Lithococcus is a genus of very small freshwater snails, aquatic gastropod mollusks in the family Cochliopidae.

Species
Species within the genus Lithococcus include:
Lithococcus aletes Thompson & Hershler, 1991
Lithococcus multicarinatus (Miller, 1878)

References

Cochliopidae